Danny Weinkauf (born 4 December 1963) is a Grammy-winning New York-based musician and composer. He has been the longtime bassist for They Might Be Giants (TMBG). He has recorded and toured with the band since the late 1990s. Weinkauf had previously performed in a band called Lincoln along with TMBG's guitarist Dan Miller and drummer Gonzalo Martinez De La Cotera. He has written four songs for TMBG, all for their children's albums. Weinkauf wrote and sang "Where Do They Make Balloons?" on the children's album No!, "Number Two" from Here Come The 123s,  "I Am a Paleontologist" from Here Comes Science, and "Elephants" from Why? He also played bass alongside bandmate John Flansburgh for his solo project Mono Puff, in addition to providing additional bass on John Linnell's State Songs album.
In 2014 Weinkauf began releasing albums for children and families as "Danny Weinkauf". That year he released "No School Today" followed by "Red Pants Band" (2016), "Totally Osome!" (2017), "Inside I Shine" (2018), and "Dinosaurs and Metaphors" in (2020). The later 4 albums were all released on his own label Red Pants Music. He performs live as Danny Weinkauf and his Red Pants Band with Tina Kenny Jones on bass, keyboards, and vocals, Steven Plesnarski on drums and vocals, and Russ Jones on guitar, bass, vocals, and ukulele. His 5 albums have received numerous awards and frequent rotation on kids radio such as Sirius XM's Kids Place Live.

Other work
Weinkauf attended Berklee College of Music for a year and got his start in music in the New York City-based band The Belltower. The band also featured Jody Porter (Fountains of Wayne), Britta Phillips (Luna - Dean and Britta), and Pete McNeal (Cake). He later played bass on Fountains of Wayne's 1996 debut album. Weinkauf has also played on albums by David Mead, Stephen Fretwell, CandyButchers, and The Davenports, among other musical acts. He and Brian Speiser produced Common Rotation's 2003 album The Big Fear and can be found in two videos of studio footage on their website.

Weinkauf produced the album The Way We Found It for artist Syd. He has also written and produced hundreds of tracks of music for television, commercials, and movies. Credits include: Sex and the City, Malcolm in the Middle, Queer Eye for the Straight Guy, Jon and Kate plus 8, ABC Wide World of Sports, HBO, CBS Sports, ESPN, Resident Life, History Channel, MTV, Food Network, A&E, Mercedes Benz, Saturn, Burger King, McDonald's, Dunkin Donuts, Radio Shack, Big Brother/Sisters, Elmer's Glue, Kohls, and many others. In 2011, Weinkauf started Red Pants Music which is a website representing his commercial, television, and film composition work.

In April 2014, Weinkauf signed with Idlewild records as a solo children's music artist and released No School Today. No School Today featured 16 tunes penned by Weinkauf with lyrics co-written by others on 3 songs. Weinkauf produced and played all the instruments on the album and featured his wife and 2 children. Children's musician Laurie Berkner appears as a guest vocalist on "Our Love Fits." 
Hank Green appears on "The Kidney That Lived in Four People" which he also co-wrote.
 
Weinkauf released videos for several of the album's songs. The album's first single, "Champion of the Spelling Bee", went to #1 on Sirius XM Kids Place Live and featured Weinkauf's 12-year-old son Kai on lead vocals.

In October 2014, Weinkauf released his first holiday single called "Wonderful Christmas Day" as a digital release on Idlewild records. In 2015 Weinkauf released 4 singles including "It's your Birthday", "My Mom", "Only One You", and "Super Powered Mindy" which have all been featured on Kids Place Live. In 2015 Weinkauf also wrote and produced the song and video "B is for Build" for Sesame Street as part of their 47th season.

Personal life
Weinkauf is married to Michelle Weinkauf, née Gotthardt.  He has two children, Lena and Kai Weinkauf, who perform spoken word parts on the song "I Am a Paleontologist". Kai sings lead vocals for "Champion of the Spelling Bee", "Together we can Fly", "Ambivalent", "Picky Eaters", "Antithesis", and "A song about Anything". Weinkauf's wife and two children perform several vocal and spoken parts on his solo albums.

Awards 
In 2002 TMBG won the Grammy for Best Song Written for Visual Media; Weinkauf played both bass and guitar. In 2009, They Might Be Giants was awarded a Grammy for Best Children's Album for Here Come the 123s, featuring one song written by Weinkauf. In 2011, TMBG was nominated a third time with Here Comes Science, which features Weinkauf's song "I Am a Paleontologist". In 2014 "No School Today" was declared a Parents' Choice Award winner and a NAPPA award winner. Weinkauf's song "Elephants" was an International Songwriting Competition winner in 2015.

References 

American rock bass guitarists
American male bass guitarists
They Might Be Giants members
1963 births
Living people
American male composers
20th-century American composers
Guitarists from New York (state)
American male guitarists
20th-century American guitarists